The  is a Holiday Rapid service train operated by East Japan Railway Company from Shinjuku to Kobuchizawa on the Chūō Main Line.

Service pattern 

 1 round trip is operated every weekend from March to November.
 Services are not operated from December to February, to prevent train failures due to the winter season, as the rolling stock, the 215 series, is not designed to withstand low temperatures and snow.

Stations served 

 Shinjuku - Mitaka - Tachikawa - Hachiōji - Takao - Sagamiko - Ōtsuki - Katsunuma-Budōkyō - Enzan - Yamanashi-shi - Isawa-Onsen - Kōfu - Nirasaki - Kobuchizawa
 The train skips Nakano and Kokubunji, where the Holiday Rapid Okutama & Akigawa would stop.
 There are days when the train makes additional stops at Uenohara, Kai-Yamato, Shiozaki, Anayama, etc.
 Westbound trains to Kobuchizawa makes two brief stops (no boarding or alighting) at Torisawa and Hinoharu, to let limited express trains overtake the train.
 Eastbound trains to Shinjuku makes a brief stop (no boarding or alighting) at Kai-Yamato, to let a limited express train to overtake the train.
 Extended services to Chiba makes additional stops after Shinjuku, which are Kinshichō - Ichikawa - Funabashi - Tsudanuma - Chiba

Ticketing 

This is different from non-reserved seating on Limited Expresses, as this train is only a Rapid service, which makes the purchase of a  unnecessary.

For reserved seating, a  costing 520 yen is required, along with the Basic Fare Ticket.

Rolling stock 

 215 series 10-car sets (based at Kōzu Depot)

 Car 1 is at the Kobuchizawa end, and Car 10 is at the Shinjuku end. This is the opposite to other trains on the Chūō Main Line.

History 

 1993: Services between Tokyo and Kobuchizawa began.
 2002: With the introduction of 215 series to the Shonan-Shinjuku Line, the eastern terminus is changed from Tokyo to Shinjuku.
 2007: Extended services to Chiba on particular days began operation.

See also 

 List of named passenger trains of Japan
 Holiday Rapid Okutama & Akigawa, another Holiday Rapid service on the Chūō Line.

References 
This article incorporates material from the corresponding article in the Japanese Wikipedia.

External links 

Named passenger trains of Japan
East Japan Railway Company
Chūō Main Line
Railway services introduced in 1993
1993 establishments in Japan